Erasmo Catarino González Bernal (born November 25, 1977, Querétaro), is a Mexican singer and the first-place winner on the popular Mexican television show La Academia 4 (2005). He was selected as the winner by the public.

Early life
Erasmo Catarino González is an indigenous Nahuatl and speaks the Nahuatl language fluently.  
He is married to Karla Sandoval.
Before entering La Academia, González was a schoolteacher, teaching second grade in a primary school for Nahuatl children in Xalpatlahuac, Guerrero. He studied elementary education in Puebla, Puebla, and received his teaching degree there.

Success
Since he appeared on La Academia he has performed in several genres, but prefers "rancheras" especially. On July 3, 2005 he became the winner of the fourth Generation.

He competed on the Mexican television program Desafío de Estrellas (2006), in which 32 of the best young Mexican singers vied for the top spot and three million pesos. Erasmo won second place; first place went to Toñita, a singer from Veracruz, from La Academia 1. His first album, "Erasmo: El Conde de Xalpatlahuac" was released in December 2005 selling more than 100,000 copies. His second album, "A Toda Banda", went on sale in mid-2006, achieving gold status weeks after the release. On June 26, 2007 Erasmo released his third album which consists of six covers and six new songs.

He is one of the few alumni from La Academia to win a muse from Premios Oye! alongside Nadia, Yahir, Yuridia and Víctor.

Discography

Albums
.

Singles

References

Catarino, Erasmo
Catarino, Erasmo
Indigenous Mexicans
Catarino, Erasmo
Catarino, Erasmo
Catarino, Erasmo
21st-century Mexican singers
21st-century Mexican male singers